Moon Jung-sik (23 June 1930 – 25 December 2006) was a South Korean football player and manager. He was a member of the South Korea national football team when they won the 1960 AFC Asian Cup.

Honours

Player
ROK Army HID
Korean President's Cup: 1954

ROK Army CIC
Korean National Championship: 1959
Korean President's Cup: 1959, 1961

Cheil Industries
Korean Semi-professional League (Spring): 1964
Korean President's Cup: 1963

South Korea
AFC Asian Cup: 1960
Asian Games silver medal: 1958, 1962

Individual
KASA Best Korean Footballer: 1960

Manager
Korea Automobile Insurance
Korean Semi-professional League (Autumn): 1978, 1980
Korean President's Cup: 1976

Ōita Trinity
Kyushu Soccer League: 1995

Individual
Korean Semi-professional League (Autumn) Best Manager: 1978
Korean President's Cup Best Manager: 1976

References

External links
 
Moon Jung-sik at KFA 

Ulsan Hyundai FC managers
1930 births
2006 deaths
South Korean footballers
Asian Games medalists in football
Footballers at the 1958 Asian Games
Footballers at the 1962 Asian Games
South Korea international footballers
1960 AFC Asian Cup players
AFC Asian Cup-winning players
Oita Trinita managers
Asian Games silver medalists for South Korea
Association football forwards
Medalists at the 1958 Asian Games
Medalists at the 1962 Asian Games
South Korean football managers